This is a list of United States politicians who were born outside the present-day United States, its territories (the District of Columbia, Puerto Rico, Guam, the U.S. Virgin Islands, the Commonwealth of the Northern Mariana Islands, and American Samoa), and its outlying possessions. This list does not include politicians from the Philippines (such as Resident Commissioners of the Philippines), which was held under various forms of government as an American territory from 1898 to 1946 before becoming a sovereign country.

United States citizenship is required to serve in Congress, as President or Vice President, and in most state offices. The President and the Vice President must additionally be a 'natural-born citizen'. Foreign-born politicians may gain U.S. citizenship by means of birth (if one or both of their parents were citizens who met the requirements to transmit citizenship at birth), derivation (if they acquired citizenship from their parents after birth but before the age of 18), or naturalization (if they acquired citizenship by fulfilling the requirements of the naturalization process as established in the Immigration and Nationality Act of 1952).

Incumbents

Members of Congress

Senators

Representatives

Cabinet members

Governors

Statewide officials

Mayors

State legislators

Others

Former

Members of Congress

Senators

Representatives

Delegates

Cabinet members 

 Christopher Memminger, Confederate States Secretary of the Treasury, born in Württemberg

Governors

Statewide officials

Mayors

State legislators

Others

Totals

Totals by country

See also
Natural-born-citizen clause (United States)
List of U.S. state governors born outside the United States
List of United States senators born outside the United States
List of foreign-born French politicians

Foreign-born